"Good Timin’" is a song by the American rock band the Beach Boys and the second single from their 1979 album L.A. (Light Album). It is one of the few songs jointly credited to Brian and Carl Wilson.

Recording
"Good Timin'" was recorded during the group's sessions at Brother Studios and Caribou Ranch in April and November 1974, respectively, with Brian contributing piano and harpsichord. The basic track was completed and Carl Wilson recorded the lead vocals. In a 1975 interview, Carl stated that the track had been slated for the group's next album. That album, which became 15 Big Ones, ultimately did not include "Good Timin'". In a 1976 interview, Dennis Wilson bemoaned the track's absence from 15 Big Ones, praising it as "another 'Surfer Girl'".

Due to negative critical reactions to the Beach Boys' "Here Comes the Night" disco single, "Good Timin'" was hastily assembled with necessary vocal overdubs by Carl and Bruce Johnston and released as a single. Johnston recalled: I'm not putting Al down or Mike but the real soldier who stuck with me the whole time was Carl. The two us sang the verses on 'Good Timin{{}}, the two of us sang the four vocal parts."

Release
"Good Timin'" reached No. 40 in the U.S. during a stay of ten weeks on the Billboard Hot 100 singles chart; and peaked at No. 33 on the Cash Box sales chart. It was their first single to reach the Top 40 portion of the chart since "It's OK" in October 1976. It also reached No. 12 on the Billboard Adult Contemporary chart.Record World'' called it a "vintage Beach Boys ballad complete with rich layers of their trademark falsetto harmonies."

Live performances
"Good Timin'" was performed live on tours throughout the early 1980s following its release. Brian sang the lead vocals during The 50th Reunion Tour with Al Jardine also on vocals filling in for Carl Wilson.

Personnel

Sourced from sessionography archivist Craig Slowinski.

Good Timin'
The Beach Boys
Carl Wilson – lead and backing vocals, guitars
Brian Wilson – piano, harpsichord, organ
Dennis Wilson – drums
Bruce Johnston – backing vocals, Fender Rhodes
Mike Love – backing vocals
Al Jardine – backing vocals

Additional musician
Jim Guercio – bass

Love Surrounds Me
The Beach Boys
Dennis Wilson – lead, harmony and backing vocals, Fender Rhodes, Oberheim and Moog synthesizers, additional drums, timpani, arrangements
 Carl Wilson – backing vocals
 Bruce Johnston - backing vocals

Additional musicians
Christine McVie – backing vocals
 Ed Carter – electric lead and rhythm guitars
 Neil Levang – dobro during closing vamp
 Joe Chemay – bass
 Carli Muñoz – grand piano
 Phil Shenale – Oberheim synthesizer during closing vamp
 Bobby Figueroa – drums
 Steve Forman – tambourine, mark tree, bell tree, cabasa during closing vamp

References

1979 singles
The Beach Boys songs
Songs written by Brian Wilson
Songs written by Carl Wilson
Song recordings produced by James William Guercio
Song recordings produced by Bruce Johnston